Völcsej is a village in Győr-Moson-Sopron County, Hungary.

References

Populated places in Győr-Moson-Sopron County